Dailon Rocha Livramento do Rosario (born 4 May 2001) is a Dutch professional footballer who plays as a forward for Eerste Divisie club MVV. Born in the Netherlands, he is of Cape Verdean descent.

Career
Livramento was born in Rotterdam, and played youth football for Excelsior, Sparta AV, Excelsior Maassluis, and NAC Breda. In 2021, he moved to Roda JC Kerkrade, where he initially joined the under-21 team. He made his professional debut for the first team on 26 October 2021, starting in a 2–1 win over FC Den Bosch in the KNVB Cup in which he contributed with his first goal.

On 3 August 2022, Livramento signed a two-year contract with an option for an additional year with Eerste Divisie club MVV. He made his debut for the club on the first matchday of the 2022–23 season, replacing Thomas van Bommel in the 74th minute of a 3–1 loss to Jong AZ. On 19 August, he scored his first professional goal as well as his first goal for the club, bagging the last goal of a 3–1 home win over ADO Den Haag.

Career statistics

References

External links
 

2001 births
Living people
Footballers from Rotterdam
Dutch footballers
Association football forwards
Excelsior Rotterdam players
Excelsior Maassluis players
NAC Breda players
Roda JC Kerkrade players
MVV Maastricht players
Eerste Divisie players
Dutch sportspeople of Cape Verdean descent